SHC-transforming protein 2 is a protein that in humans is encoded by the SHC2 gene.

Interactions
SHC2 has been shown to interact with Kinase insert domain receptor.

References

Further reading